Miles Batty (born 4 June 1987) is a former track athlete who specialized in middle-distance disciplines. In high school, he was one of the most prolific cross country and distance track runners in the state of Utah. Competing for BYU, Batty earned eight first-team All-American awards, two NCAA championships, broke the NCAA record in the indoor mile, and contributed to BYU's track team successes. After graduating from BYU, he finished 10th at the 2012 US Olympic Trials for the 1500-meter race and went on to compete professionally through a sponsorship contract with ASICS.

Running career

High school
Batty attended and ran for Jordan High School until he graduated in 2005. In addition to being state champion of Utah in cross country, his personal best in the mile as a high schooler was 4:22 (min:sec).

Collegiate
Right after high school, Batty went on a two-year mission to Brazil, during which he did not participate in any competitive running. Upon his return to BYU, he struggled to get into shape and even questioned the chances of himself succeeding as a college runner.

In February 2012 at the 2012 Millrose Games, Batty broke the indoor collegiate mile record by almost half a second with a time of 3:54.54. His record time was beaten in February 2013 at the 2013 Millrose Games by Chris O'Hare with a time of 3:52.98. Batty dropped to number three on the NCAA all-time mile list in 2014 when Lawi Lalang clocked a 3:52.88, also at the Millrose Games.

After qualifying and winning at NCAA's track championship, Batty was named National Men's Track Athlete of the Year by USATF in 2011, and also helped BYU's distance relay team win the national championship. As of August 2011, he was ranked number 9 in the United States in the 1500 meters discipline.

Awards and honors 
 2018 West Coast Conference Hall of Honor Inductee
 2013 NCAA Today's Top 10 Award
 2012 NCAA Walter Byers Scholarship
 2-Time NCAA Champion 
 8-Time NCAA First Team All-American 
 2011 NCAA Indoor Track Athlete of the Year 
 2011 USA Track & Field Athlete of the Week

Top Performances

References

1987 births
Living people
American male middle-distance runners
BYU Cougars men's track and field athletes
Track and field athletes from Salt Lake City
BYU Cougars men's cross country runners